Age of Kings may refer to:
 Age of Empires II: The Age of Kings, 1999 real-time strategy video game
 Age of Empires: The Age of Kings, 2006 turn-based strategy video game
 An Age of Kings, 1960 BBC TV series of Shakespeare's English history plays